The Fort Wayne United FC Gryphons is a 3-tier (Academy, Elite, and Premier) developmental soccer club based in Fort Wayne, Indiana, and was created in 2013 by the merger of Fort Wayne Fever and Citadel Futbol Club. The club is a nonprofit (c)3 organization. The women's team competes in United Women's Soccer.

History
The merger to create the club in 2013 left only one other competitor, Fort Wayne SportClub.

Year-by-year

Women

Sponsors 
The current sponsor for uniforms is Puma. The soccer league has partnered with Puma since its creation in fall 2013.
The league is also sponsored by Penn Station East Coast Subs, Parkview Health Network, and the Beasley National Soccer School.

Uniforms

The goalkeepers wear the same uniforms, except the jerseys are a long-sleeved orange jersey with purple accents and a short-sleeved purple jersey with white accents.

References

Association football clubs established in 2013
Sports in Fort Wayne, Indiana
Soccer clubs in Indiana
2013 establishments in Indiana
United Women's Soccer teams